The British Black Panthers (BBP) or the British Black Panther movement (BPM) was a Black Power organisation in the United Kingdom that fought for the rights of black people and racial minorities in the country. The BBP were inspired by the US Black Panther Party, though they were unaffiliated with them. The British Panthers adopted the principle of political blackness, which included activists of black as well as South Asian origin. The movement started in 1968 and lasted until around 1973.

The movement reached its pinnacle with the 1970 Mangrove Nine Trial. The trial, involving members of the Panther Movement and other black activists, succeeded in fighting  against police harassment of Frank Crichlow's Mangrove restaurant.

About 
The BBP worked to educate black communities and fight against racial discrimination. Members of the BBP worked to educate one another and British communities about black history. The BBP used imagery and symbols already established by the Black Panther Party in the United States. They were fighting against police brutality in the UK and they "emphasized their own preparedness and willingness to confront police when necessary." The BPM also opposed the Immigration Act 1971, defended communities against fascist violence, held civil rights demonstrations, and supported Caribbean and Palestinian liberation struggles. Black and South Asian activists were involved with the group.

Several branches existed, but the main centre of the organisation was in Brixton, South London. The BBP also had a Youth League. Headquarters, at 38 Shakespeare Road, were purchased with a donation from writer John Berger (half of his 1972 Booker Prize award for the novel G.). The BBP published its own newspaper called Freedom News, and other publications such as Black Power Speaks (1968) and Black People's News Service (1970).

Neil Kenlock, a Jamaican-born photographer, was a member of the BBP and documented their activities.

History 
Malcolm X was visiting the UK between 1964 and 1965, and Stokely Carmichael's address at the Dialectics of Liberation Congress at the Roundhouse in London in 1967, inspired many in Britain's Black power movement. Carmichael's speech and visit influenced writer Obi Egbuna. Egbuna, in 1966, spent time in the United States learning about the black power movement in the United States. Activists in Britain were also inspired by the Black Panther newspaper, and watching reports on the US Black Panthers on the BBC.

The British Black Panther Movement (BPM) were founded in the summer of 1968, by Obi Egbuna, Darcus Howe, Linton Kwesi Johnson and Olive Morris, who were influenced by the American Black Panther Party. Other early members included Altheia Jones-LeCointe, as well as south Asian activists such as Farrukh Dhondy and Mala Sen under the banner of "blackness", with "black" as a political label for all people of colour; for example, the related Southall Black Sisters were an Asian organisation.

In 1969, the Race Today political magazine was founded by the Race Today Collective, becoming a leading organ for Black and Asian politics in 1970s Britain. It was founded by BPM members including Darcus Howe, Farrukh Dhondy, Linton Kwesi Johnson, and Mala Sen.

The group was initially known as the British Black Power Movement, but after about a year, changed its name to the British Black Panthers. Egbuna had been arrested and was convicted in December 1968 on the charge of a conspiracy to murder police officers because of an essay he wrote about resisting police violence. The arrest attracted the first media attention the group received, where they were labelled as "black racialists" and "extremists."

After Egbuna, Altheia Jones-LeCointe took his place as leader of the movement. The growth of the organisation was slow, but by the early 1970s, they were "firmly ensconced in Britain's left political culture," and there were around 3,000 members.

In March 1970, about 300 BBP members demonstrated in front of the American Embassy in Grosvenor Square to protest against the treatment of the American Black Panthers. On 9 August 1970, 150 protesters involved with the BBP demonstrated against the constant police raids on the Mangrove, a black-owned restaurant in Ladbroke Grove, a West Indian neighbourhood in west London. There were 700 police involved, and violence and arrests took place. In addition to the police, a Special Branch "black power desk" monitored the protest. Nineteen members of the BBP were arrested, though later the charges against 10 were dropped. The remaining people, who became known as the "Mangrove Nine", chose to either defend themselves or have "radical barrister Ian McDonald" represent them. They also requested all-black juries, citing Magna Carta as precedent. All members of the Mangrove Nine were later found not-guilty by the jury.

The British Black Panther Movement were under extensive State surveillance by the Special Branch's "Black Power Desk". Top-secret documents were uncovered by Robin Bunce and Paul Field whilst writing their political biography of Darcus Howe. The State sought to end the Black Power movement and imprison leading figures within the BPM.

Eventually the movement "collapsed amid infighting, power struggles and 'kangaroo courts'," according to The Guardian.

Impact 
Actions and educational efforts by the BBP helped expose racism in schools and in the government. The trial of the Mangrove Nine drew attention to the fight against racism in the UK police force. Robin Bunce, a biographer of Howe, said: "He basically turned it into a trial of the Police.... His defence appealed to the Magna Carta, and the media loved it because it was rooted in English traditions of fair play, but was also enormously radical and subversively funny."

As the BBP began to fall apart in 1973, a number of women including Beverley Bryan, Olive Morris and Liz Obi organised to form the Brixton Black Women's Group in Brixton.

In recent years, Kenlock's photographs of the BPM have been featured in exhibitions and other media. A 2013 project by Brixton arts organisation Photofusion conducted oral histories interviews with a number of members and held an exhibition of Kenlock's photographs of the BPM curated by young people. Tate Britain's 2017 display Stan Firm Inna Inglan: Black Diaspora in London, 1960–70s, featured photographers, including Kenlock, who captured the experiences of black people during that time.

A television drama miniseries, Guerrilla (2017), explores the British Black Panthers movement in the early 1970s. However, American magazine Ebony criticised the series for not representing black women in leadership roles in the black power movement of the UK. There has also been some controversy over Freida Pinto's casting as a female lead, which has been defended as historically appropriate by early British Black Panther members, Farrukh Dhondy and Neil Kenlock, noting the central role of British Asians in the movement, including Asian women such as Mala Sen, who inspired Pinto's character.

Notable members

See also
Black panther (disambiguation)#Political organisations

References

Citations

Sources

External links 
 British Black Panther Movement oral histories Black Cultural Archives
 BBPP x Organised Youth (2013 video)

1968 establishments in the United Kingdom
African and Black nationalism in the United Kingdom
Anti-racism in the United Kingdom
Black Power
Black British history